Mellemfolkeligt Samvirke (MS Danish Association for International Co-operation) is a Danish, politically independent humanitarian non-governmental organisation that struggles for a fairer world. The organisation works for increased understanding and solidarity between the peoples of the world, as well as promoting global development based on the sustainable use and just distribution of wealth and resources.

MS started as Fredsvenners Hjælpearbejde in 1944. In 1946 the organisation changed its name to Mellemfolkeligt Samvirke, and in 1974 it adopted open membership. Currently, MS has more than 23.000 individual members, as well as approximately 100 member-organisations.

Mellemfolkeligt Samvirke cooperates with more than 100 local partners in Latin America, Eastern Africa and Nepal, and maintains local offices in many of the countries (e.g. MS Tanzania, MS Nepal, etc.). Via its volunteer programme Global Contact, it sends more than 500 volunteers abroad annually, to support local development work.

In 1994 association with the Irish Kimmage Development Studies Centre, the MS Training
Centre for Development Cooperation(MS-TCDC) began running of a Certificate in Community Development  course, in Arusha, Tanzania. In 2001 as part of the partnership with, Kimmage DSC a Diploma in Development Studies was offered, which in 2004 became the Level 7 BA Degree in Development Studies, which is validated by the Irish governments Higher Education and Training Awards Council(HETAC). The course is recognised by the Tanzanian governments National Council for Technical Education(NACTE).

In recent years, Mellemfolkeligt Samvirke has strengthened its public profile by arranging public debates, festivals and an annual door-to-door collection of contributions.

External links 
 Mellemfolkeligt Samvirke homepage (English)

References

Non-profit organizations based in Denmark
Political advocacy groups in Denmark
Organizations established in 1946